Cam Stewart (a.k.a.: Red Heat, The Raging Red Head) (born April 4, 1975), is a Canadian sports broadcaster who hosted the radio program Red Heat on the defunct The Score Satellite Radio and co-hosted Live @theScore and Score on the NFL on The Score Television Network. Other roles on the Score Satellite Radio included co-hosting Drive This!, "Morency" "Covers Experts" and "24in30". He grew up in the Greater Toronto area where he had a memorable high school football career in which he once recorded 4 sacks in a single game. Cam spent time in Yellowknife, Northwest Territories where he was first introduced into the sports media industry.

He is currently a contributor to the FNTSY Sports Network appearing alongside Gabriel Morency and can also be heard on John Oakley's radio program on AM 640 in Toronto. Stewart is John's guest each Monday and Friday as the show wraps up from 6:30 to 7:00 pm. Although Cam's role is expected to be talking about sports and gambling, he somehow manages to address the problems and topics of the modern world with his own special brand of irreverence and humour.

References

External links

Cam Stewart on The Hockey Betting Podcast

Living people
1975 births
Canadian people of Scottish descent
Canadian radio sportscasters